Mortal Kombat is an arcade fighting game developed and released by Midway in 1992. It is the first entry in the Mortal Kombat series and subsequently was released by Acclaim Entertainment for nearly every home platform of the time. The game focuses on several characters of various intentions who enter a martial arts tournament with worldly consequences. It introduced many key aspects of the Mortal Kombat series, including the unique five-button control scheme and gory finishing moves called Fatalities.

Mortal Kombat is considered one of the greatest video games of all time by critics and audiences in 21st century and became a best-selling game and remains one of the most popular fighting games in the genre's history, spawning numerous sequels and spin-offs over the following years and decades, beginning with Mortal Kombat II in 1993, which is also considered one of the greatest video games of all time. Both games were the subject of a successful film adaptation in 1995. However, it also sparked much controversy for its depiction of extreme violence and gore using realistic digitized graphics, and, along with the home release of Night Trap, prompted the formation of the Entertainment Software Rating Board (ESRB), a U.S. government-backed organization that set descriptor ratings for video games.

Gameplay

Mortal Kombat is a fighting game in which players battle opponents in one-on-one matches. The fighter that completely drains the opponent's health bar first wins the round, and the first to win two rounds wins the match. Each round is timed; if both fighters still have health remaining when time runs out, the one with more health wins the round. Two players can start a game together, or a second player can join in during a single player's game to fight against them. If a game was in progress at the time, the winner continues it alone; if not, the winner begins a new game.

Mortal Kombat uses an eight-directional joystick and five buttons, including two punch and two kick buttons, each further differentiated between high and low. Attacks can vary depending on the player's distance from the opponent. All player characters have a shared set of attacks performed by holding the joystick in various directions, such as a leg sweep and an uppercut; the latter attack knocks the enemy high into the air and causes a large amount of damage. Most special moves were performed by tapping the joystick, sometimes ending with a button press. Unlike previous one-on-one fighting games, few moves require circular joystick movement. The game's blocking system also distinguished itself from other fighting games, as characters take a small amount of damage from regular moves while blocking. However, the dedicated block button allows users to defend against attacks without retreating and blocking characters lose very little ground when struck, thus making counterattacks much easier after a successful block.

Mortal Kombat further introduced the concept of "juggling", knocking an opponent into the air and following up with a combination of attacks while the enemy is still airborne and defenseless. The idea became so popular that it has spread to many other games. Another of the game's innovations was the Fatality, a finishing move performed against a defeated opponent to execute them in a gruesome fashion.

In the single-player game, the player faces each of the seven playable characters in a series of one-on-one matches against computer-controlled opponents, ending in a "Mirror Match" against a duplicate of the player's chosen character. The player must then fight in three endurance matches, each of which involves two opponents. As soon as the player defeats the first opponent, the second one enters the arena and the timer resets; however, the player's health meter does not regenerate. After the third endurance match, the player fights the sub-boss Goro, followed by a final match against Shang Tsung.

Between certain levels, players can compete in a minigame called "Test Your Might" for bonus points, breaking blocks of various materials by filling a meter past a certain point through rapid button presses. The first material the player must break is wood, followed by stone, steel, ruby, and finally diamond, with each successive material requiring more of the meter to be filled up and thus awarding more points. Two players can compete in the minigame at once and the last two materials are only accessible through two-player mode. The minigame would return in various forms in Mortal Kombat: Deadly Alliance, Mortal Kombat: Shaolin Monks, Mortal Kombat vs. DC Universe, Mortal Kombat: Komplete Edition, Mortal Kombat X, and its DLC counterpart, Mortal Kombat XL.

Plot

The game takes place in Earthrealm, where a tournament is being held on Shang Tsung's Island, on which seven of its locations serve as stages in the game. The introduction to Mortal Kombat explains that Shang Tsung was banished to Earthrealm 500 years previously and, with the help of the monstrous Goro, is able to seize control of the Mortal Kombat tournament in an attempt to doom the realm. For 500 years straight, Goro has been undefeated in the tournament, and won nine consecutive tournaments. If Goro wins again, Shao Kahn, Emperor of Outworld, will be allowed to take Earthrealm. In order to prevent this, a new generation of warriors must challenge Goro. The player receives information about the characters in biographies displayed during the attract mode. The bulk of the game's backstory and lore was only told in a comic book, but some additional information about the characters and their motivations for entering the tournament is received upon completion of the game with each character.

Characters

Mortal Kombat includes 7 playable characters, each with their own unique Fatality and all of whom would eventually become trademark characters and appear in several sequels. The game was developed with digitized sprites based on real actors.

Ho-Sung Pak plays Liu Kang, a former member of the White Lotus society who enters the tournament representing the Shaolin temples. Elizabeth Malecki plays the Special Forces agent, Sonya Blade, who enters in pursuit of a dangerous criminal from the Black Dragon organization, Kano, played by Richard Divizio. Carlos Pesina plays Raiden (spelled "Rayden" in the MS-DOS and console ports), a thunder god who competes in the tournament as a mortal, while Daniel Pesina, Carlos' brother, plays the Hollywood movie star Johnny Cage and the undead spectre Scorpion, a ninja who was murdered prior to the events of the tournament and brought back to life to avenge his own death. The yellow color of Scorpion's outfit was changed to blue to create his rival and murderer Sub-Zero, a member of the Lin Kuei clan of assassins who has the power to generate ice. Mortal Kombat would become famous for such palette swaps that would continue to be used in later games as the technique to create new characters.

The four-armed Shokan warrior, Goro serves as the sub-boss of the game; being a half-human, half-dragon beast, he is much stronger than the other characters and cannot be affected by throw attacks. The character's sprites are based on a stop motion model which was created by Curt Chiarelli. Shang Tsung, the game's main antagonist and final boss (who was played by two actors, Eric Kincade and Ho-Sung Pak, although only the latter is credited in the actual game) is a sorcerer who can transform into any playable character in the game at any time during a battle.

When fighting on the Pit stage, the player could qualify to fight the secret character, Reptile, a green-clad palette swap of Scorpion and Sub-Zero who uses both characters' moves, by meeting a special set of conditions. Goro, Shang Tsung, and Reptile were non-playable characters. The Masked Guard in the Courtyard stage was portrayed by Mortal Kombat developer John Vogel.

Development
Mortal Kombat creators Ed Boon and John Tobias have stated that Midway Games tasked them with the project of developing a "combat game for release within a year", which the two believed was intended to compete with the popular Street Fighter II: The World Warrior. According to Tobias, he and Boon had envisioned a fighting game similar to Data East's Karate Champ but featuring large digitized characters even before that, and the success of Capcom's Street Fighter II only helped them convince the management of their idea. Boon said the development team initially consisted of four people — himself as programmer, artists John Tobias and John Vogel, and Dan Forden as sound designer. The game's budget was around $1 million.

According to Richard Divizio and Daniel Pesina, Mortal Kombat had actually begun when Tobias along with Divizio and the brothers Daniel and Carlos Pesina planned to create a ninja-themed fighting game, however this idea was rejected by Midway's entire management. Instead, Midway sought to make an action game based on the upcoming movie Universal Soldier and featuring a digitized version of martial arts film star Jean-Claude Van Damme, but he was already in negotiations with another company for a video game that ultimately was never released. Divizio then convinced Tobias to return to their original project. In the end, Van Damme was parodied in the game in the form of Johnny Cage (with whom he shares his name's initials, JC), a narcissistic Hollywood movie star who performs a split punch to the groin in a nod to a scene from Bloodsport. Tobias credited other inspirations as having come from the Asian martial arts cinema.

Boon later said, "since the beginning, one of the things that's separated us from other fighting games is the crazy moves we've put in it, like fireballs and all the magic moves, so to speak." According to Tobias, the game's ultraviolent content had not been originally intended and was only implemented gradually as the development progressed. The concept of Fatalities in particular evolved from the "dizzied" mechanic in earlier fighting games. Boon said that he hated the "dizzied" mechanic, but that it was fun to have one's opponent get dizzied and get in a free hit. Boon and Tobias decided they could eliminate the aggravation of getting dizzied by having it occur at the end of the fight, after the outcome had already been decided. An early version of the game used two more buttons for middle punch and kick attacks.

Mortal Kombat was reportedly developed in 10 months from 1991 to 1992, with a test version seeing limited release halfway through the development cycle. As a demo version of the game, which featured only six characters (all male), became internally popular within Midway offices, the team was given more time to work on it, resulting in the addition of Sonya to the roster. Footage for the game's digitized characters was filmed with Tobias' personal Hi-8 camcorder. The final arcade game used eight megabytes of graphics data, with each character having 64 colors and around 300 frames of animation.

The team had difficulty settling on a name for the game. Ed Boon has stated that for six months during development "nobody could come up with a name nobody didn't hate." Some of the names suggested were Kumite, Dragon Attack, Death Blow and Fatality. One day, someone had written down "combat" on the drawing board for the names in Boon's office and someone wrote a K over the C, according to Boon, "just to be kind of weird." Pinball designer Steve Ritchie was sitting in Boon's office, saw the word "Kombat" and said to him, "Why don't you name it Mortal Kombat?", a name that Boon stated "just stuck." John Tobias recalled this a bit differently, saying it "came about during the trademark process in naming the game. We really liked Mortal Combat as a name, but it couldn't get past legal." Since then, the series has begun frequently using the letter K in place of the letter C when it has the hard C sound.

Release

Although the arcade version of Mortal Kombat was never localized in Japan, it still had an official release there in 1992 by Taito, who published North American imports of Midway's game.

The launch of Mortal Kombat for home consoles by Acclaim Entertainment was one of the largest video game launches of the time. A flood of TV commercials heralded the simultaneous release of all four home versions of the game, SNES, Genesis, Game Boy and Game Gear,  on September 13, 1993, a date dubbed "Mortal Monday". In the same year, an official comic book, Mortal Kombat Collector's Edition, was written and illustrated by the game's designer artist John Tobias and made available through mail order, describing the backstory of the game in greater detail. The comic was advertised during the game's attract mode and would later be sold normally around the country, although it was quite difficult to get a copy outside of the United States. The comic was also later included as a series of unlockable bonuses in Mortal Kombat: Deadly Alliance.

Mortal Kombat: The Album, an album by The Immortals featuring techno music, was released in May 1994. It features two themes for the game, "Techno Syndrome" and "Hypnotic House", as well as themes written for each character. "Techno Syndrome" was adapted for the 1995 movie soundtrack and incorporated the familiar "Mortal Kombat!" yell from the Mortal Monday commercials. Jeff Rovin also penned a novelization of the first Mortal Kombat game, which was published in June 1995 in order to coincide with the release of the first movie. There were also lines of action figures based on the game's characters.

Home versions

Four official ports were released in North America as part of the "Mortal Monday" campaign in 1993: home console ports for the Super Nintendo Entertainment System (SNES) and Sega Genesis, and handheld console ports for the Game Boy and Game Gear. While the SNES version's visuals and audio were more arcade accurate than those of the Genesis version, it has less precise controls and due to Nintendo's "family friendly" policies, replaces the blood with sweat and most of the Fatalities with less violent "finishing moves". The sweat effect, which was a palette coloration added after Nintendo's decision to censor the game, could be reverted to the original red blood color via a Game Genie code input as "BDB4-DD07". On the Genesis version, the blood and uncensored Fatalities were available via a cheat code, spelled out "ABACABB", a nod to the Abacab album by the band Genesis, who shared their name with the North American version of the console. This version was given an MA-13 rating by the Videogame Rating Council.

The Game Boy version was largely cut down from its arcade counterpart. It had laggy controls and a limited button layout. It also omitted Johnny Cage, Reptile and the bloodier Fatality moves. However, players could play as Goro via a code. Johnny Cage was apparently intended to be a playable character, but was cut out; bits of his character data remain in the data files. The Game Gear version was similar to the Game Boy version, but with major improvements (color, faster gameplay, and tighter controls). Like its 16-bit counterpart, the game was censored unless a cheat code (2, 1, 2, Down, Up) had been entered, but lacked Kano and Reptile. A Master System port based on the Game Gear version was released for PAL regions in early 1994. According to Phylene Riggs of Acclaim, an NES port was also planned at one point, but cancelled before it entered the programming stage.

A port for DOS PCs was released in late 1993. The DOS version is the most accurate port of the arcade version in terms of graphics and gameplay. It was first released on floppy disk and later re-released on CD-ROM, with that release upgraded with the original arcade music and sound effects. An Amiga version was released in early 1994 in Europe only, with graphics based on the Genesis version, controls limited to either one or two action buttons, and a minimal soundtrack with music arranged by Allister Brimble. The DOS version was eventually released on GOG.com.

The Sega CD version of the game was released featuring a video intro of the Mortal Monday commercial. This port did not require a code to be entered to access the uncensored content and thus was given an MA-17 rating. While this port was technologically inferior to the better-looking SNES port and had loading times, it resembled the arcade version more faithfully in actual gameplay. It also featured the authentic CD-DA soundtrack, taken directly from the arcade version, but some of the arenas feature the wrong music (such as Courtyard playing the Pit's theme). Several remixes of the Mortal Kombat theme music were included as bonus features, including the remix used later for the film adaptation. Some copies of this version are incompatible with model 1.1 of the Sega CD; Acclaim offered to replace any such discs that were mailed to their Oyster Bay headquarters with working copies.

A conversion of the game was being developed by Iguana Entertainment and scheduled to be published on the Atari Jaguar, but it was never released.

In 2004, Jakks Pacific released the game as one of its Plug It in & Play TV Games, developed by Digital Eclipse. It is a unique port made directly from the arcade code by Chris Burke, who was the sole programmer on the port. Due to hardware limitations from the uncommon processor used by the Jakks Pacific units, the backgrounds are static and feature no parallax scrolling. Both censored and uncensored versions were released, rated T for Teen and M for Mature respectively.

Also in 2004, the premium edition of Mortal Kombat: Deception on the PlayStation 2 and original Xbox included the game as bonus content played via emulation of the original arcade code. While it was promoted as "arcade perfect", there were some emulation issues with the sound and gameplay.

The game was also a part of the 2005 compilation Midway Arcade Treasures: Extended Play. Like the Mortal Kombat: Deception release, it has sound issues. On August 31, 2011, Warner Bros. Interactive Entertainment released Mortal Kombat Arcade Kollection, consisting of Mortal Kombat, Mortal Kombat II and Ultimate Mortal Kombat 3, as a downloadable title for Microsoft Windows, PlayStation 3, and Xbox 360.

After the lukewarm response to the SNES version of the game, developer Sculptured Software, who handled the Super Nintendo port, proposed releasing an updated version for the system titled Mortal Kombat Nitro, which would feature additional content such as new costumes, an expanded story mode with multiple endings, and Goro, Shang Tsung and Reptile made playable in addition to the restoration of the original fatalities and blood. Although a prototype was made, development was halted in order to fully focus on the SNES port of Mortal Kombat II.

Reception
In the United States, RePlay reported Mortal Kombat to be the second most-popular upright arcade cabinet in September 1992. It then topped the RePlay upright arcade cabinet charts from October to November 1992, then from February to March 1993, and then in November 1993. It also topped the Play Meter arcade chart in December 1992. It was the second top-grossing arcade game of Summer 1993, below NBA Jam, according to RePlay. It was one of America's top two highest-grossing arcade games of 1993 (along with NBA Jam), exceeding the  domestic box office gross of the film Jurassic Park the same year. It also topped the Sega CD sales chart in June 1994.

In November 1993, Acclaim announced that they had shipped more than three million copies of Mortal Kombat for home systems, counting the SNES, Genesis, Game Boy and Game Gear versions combined. The game sold  copies worldwide in its first three weeks of release. In the United States, it was the top-selling Sega Genesis and SNES game in January 1994.  In the United Kingdom, it was the top-selling home video game in October 1993, the top-selling Sega Master System game for four months in 1994 (from May to August), and the top-selling Mega CD game in June 1994.

, it has sold  cartridges worldwide across all platforms, with the Genesis version accounting for the majority of sales. , the original arcade version has sold 24,000 arcade units and grossed an estimated .

Reviews

The arcade game received mixed reviews upon release from Computer and Video Games and Sinclair User. The digitized sprite graphics were praised and compared favorably with Pit-Fighter, but the gameplay was compared unfavorably with Street Fighter II and Fatal Fury 2.

Upon release on home systems, the game received generally positive reviews. GamePro hailed the SNES port of Mortal Kombat as having graphics closer to the arcade version than the other three initial home ports, with cleaner definition and a better color palette, and said that while four of the fatalities had been cut, the new finishing moves which replace them "are pretty cool, though not as bloody." Comparing it to the Genesis version, they found that the controls are less responsive but the sound is better due to the higher quality and inclusion of the announcer's voice. They concluded, "Despite some control glitches and the altered Fatality Moves, Mortal Kombat for the SNES is a great representation of an arcade classic that will more than satisfy most gamers." However, the Nintendo version’s widely reported censorship of blood and dismemberments affected sales, and was widely criticized by gaming media for censorship issues  into the following decades. In 2006, IGN named it as the eighth worst arcade-to-console conversion. Nintendo's decision to make the game more family-friendly was also included on GameSpy's list of the dumbest moments in gaming. Reviewing the Super NES release, Nintendo Power praised the games graphics, animation and sound as "excellent" while noting that four of the finishing moves are not identical to the arcade game. The review criticized the game as "pretty easy unless you set the difficulty to hard."

GamePros review of the Genesis port echoed the comparisons mentioned in their SNES review, but noted that while all the arcade version fatalities are included in "Mode A", they are noticeably cruder in appearance. They also criticized the fact that the port was developed for the three-button controller, saying this makes some moves awkward to pull off, but concluded, "Great graphics, sound, and control in combination with the special Mode A setting make the Genesis Mortal Kombat a beat-em-up force."

Highly praising the graphical detail and sharpness, as well as the bloody action when the violence code is enabled, GamePro declared the Game Gear version to be "everything its 16-bit big brother is, plus it's portable." They noted that the audio is fairly basic and, as with all four initial home ports, it has issues with the controls, but considered it an overall impressive achievement for a portable system.

Bill Kunkel wrote in Electronic Games that both Genesis and Super NES ports of the game as "superb, first-rate conversions" noting that the SNES edition graphically was better than the Sega Genesis version while noting that "the characters, while they don't move quite as quickly as their Genesis counterparts, are magnificently animated." Kunkel noted the exception of the character Goro who "suffers from comparatively crude animation".  Kunkel noted the difficulty in pulling off the moves in the game, finding that some players will "be frustrated by the awkwardness of the commands" and that "those unfamiliar with the game will frequently find themselves accidentally discharging specialty moves while attempting a simple spin kick or other stunt."

Reviewing the Game Boy version, GamePro commented, "If you think the moves on the other systems are hard to execute, wait until you try to pull a move on the Game Boy. The unresponsive two-button controls are almost impossible to master. The game play is also abysmally slow, and the fighters don't always connect, even when they're close to an opponent." Additionally bemoaning the difficult-to-discern graphics, weak animation, and minimal sound, they deemed it the worst version of the game. Reviewing the Game Boy version of the game, Nintendo Power stated that the graphic have been simplified but that "the essence of the Super NES and arcade games have been well-preserved" while noting that "the animation, not surprisingly, is considerably slower than the Super NES."

The Sega CD version was even more harshly criticized by gaming media. The reviewers of Electronic Gaming Monthly described it as over-hyped with only minor improvements over the Genesis version, and complained of the lag times. GamePro similarly commented "The original Mortal Kombat is back, this time on CD, and you'd think there'd be some improvements. Think again." They criticized that the load times between fights and lag times during fights "give the game a quirky, out-of-touch feel."

Accolades
Electronic Gaming Monthly awarded Mortal Kombat the title of "Most Controversial Game of 1993". In 1995, the Daily News wrote, "the original Mortal Kombat video game debuted in 1992. Its combination of story line, character and mega-violence soon made it a hit worldwide. And the controversy engendered by its blood-gushing special effects only served to boost its popularity." In 1996, GamesMaster listed the arcade version 81st in their "Top 100 Games of All Time." In 1995, Flux magazine rated the arcade version 5th on its "Top 100 Video Games."  They praised the digitized graphics, storyline, gameplay and characters. In 2004, readers of Retro Gamer voted Mortal Kombat as the 55th top retro game, with the staff commenting that "future versions would address the limitations of the first game, but this is where it all began." CraveOnline ranked it second of the top ten 2D fighters of all time, and Forbes called Mortal Kombat one of the "most loved arcade games" that was "king of the arcade" in its day, writing that the arcade machines of the original title sell for any price between a few hundred dollars to $2,500. In 2011, Complex ranked the first Mortal Kombat as the 12th best fighting game of all time, while Wirtualna Polska ranked it as the 19th best Amiga game. In 2012, Time named it one of the 100 greatest video games of all time. In 2013, the first Mortal Kombat was ranked as the best arcade game of the 1990s by Complex (the sequel, which "took everything we loved about the original and magnified it by about a million," was given sixth place on the list). In 2019, The Strong National Museum of Play inducted Mortal Kombat to its World Video Game Hall of Fame.

Controversy

Mortal Kombat was one of many violent video games that came into prominence between 1992 and 1993, generating controversy among parents and public officials. Hearings on video game violence and the corruption of society, headed by Senators Joseph Lieberman and Herb Kohl, were held in late 1992 to 1993. The legislators were especially concerned with the realistic replica of human figures in games, such as Mortal Kombat, Night Trap, Doom and Lethal Enforcers, as opposed to cartoonish characters in other violent games such as Eternal Champions or Time Killers. The result of the hearings was that the entertainment software industry was given one year to form a working rating system or the federal government would intervene and create its own system. Eventually, the Entertainment Software Rating Board (ESRB) was conceived, requiring all video games to be rated and for these ratings to be placed on the games' packaging.

Notes

References

External links

Mortal Kombat at MobyGames

1992 video games
Acclaim Entertainment games
Amiga games
Arcade video games
Assembly language software
Cancelled Atari Jaguar games
Censored video games
DOS games
DOS/4GW games
Game Boy games
Games commercially released with DOSBox
Master System games
Midway video games
Mortal Kombat games
Obscenity controversies in video games
Sega CD games
Game Gear games
Sega Genesis games
Super Nintendo Entertainment System games
Tiger Electronics handheld games
Fighting games
Video games scored by Allister Brimble
Video games scored by Dan Forden
Video games scored by Sam Powell
Video games set on fictional islands
Video games with digitized sprites
Video games with rotoscoped graphics
World Video Game Hall of Fame
Multiplayer and single-player video games
Video games developed in the United States